The  is a constituency that represents Fukui Prefecture in the House of Councillors in the Diet of Japan. It has two Councillors in the 242-member house.

Outline
The constituency represents the entire population of Fukui Prefecture. The district elects two Councillors to six-year terms, one at alternating elections held every three years. The district has 644,447 registered voters as of September 2015. Following the merger of the Tottori and Shimane districts into the Tottori-Shimane at-large district and the Tokushima and Kochi districts into the Tokushima-Kochi at-large district in 2015, Fukui became the electorate with the smallest population, thus making it the standard for measuring malapportionment in other districts. The Councillors currently representing Fukui are:
 Masaaki Yamazaki (Liberal Democratic Party (LDP), fourth term; term ends in 2016. Ceased being an official member of the LDP upon becoming president of the House of Councillors in August 2013.)
 Hirofumi Takinami (LDP, first term; term ends in 2019)

Elected Councillors

Election results

See also
List of districts of the House of Councillors of Japan

References 

Districts of the House of Councillors (Japan)